Alex Niven (born 18 February 1984, Hexham, Northumberland) is an English writer, poet, editor, and former musician.

He is also currently a Lecturer in English Literature at Newcastle University and an editor at Repeater Books.

Early life and education

Alex Niven was born in Hexham, Northumberland.

Career

In 2006, Niven was a founding member of the indie band Everything Everything,  with friends from Queen Elizabeth High School and played guitar with the band between 2007 and 2009. 
In 2009, he left the band to study for a doctorate at St John's College, Oxford and to pursue a writing career.

Formerly assistant editor at New Left Review and editor-in-chief at The Oxonian Review, Niven wrote for The Guardian, The Independent, openDemocracy, Agenda, The Cambridge Quarterly, English Literary History, Oxford Poetry, Notes and Queries, The Quietus, a number of collective blogs, in addition to his own blog The Fantastic Hope (2007-2017).

Work
In 2011, Niven's first work of criticism, Folk Opposition, was published by Zero Books. The book attempted to reclaim a variety of folk culture motifs for the political left, and excoriated the "Green Tory" zeitgeist that had accompanied the ascendancy of David Cameron's Conservative Party in Britain in 2009-10.  Writing in the journal of the Institute for Public Policy Research, Niki Seth-Smith described it as a "rebuttal to ... knee jerk reactions [about folk culture] by way of careful historicisation and incisive cultural analysis", while Joe Kennedy of The Quietus described it as "one of 2011's most incisive polemics". 

In 2014, his second book, a study of the Oasis album Definitely Maybe, was published in Bloomsbury's 33⅓ series. The Times Literary Supplement praised its "convincing modulation between a discussion of the post-Thatcher north-west England that informed Oasis's early lyrics, and the finer points of pentatonic and mixolydian melody governing Noel Gallagher's early songwriting". LA Review of Books reviewer Rhian E. Jones judged the book a success, concluding that "Niven displays a thorough appreciation of what made Oasis good while remaining aware of their shortcomings".

In 2014, his first collection of poetry, The Last Tape, was published, and his poem "The Beehive" provided the epigraph to Owen Hatherley's 2012 architecture survey A New Kind of Bleak.

In 2019, his third book was published: New Model Island: How to Build a Radical Culture beyond the idea of England.

Contributing articles
'Covid-19 is helping the Tories redraw the political map of England', The Guardian, 21 September 2020

References

External links
 The Fantastic Hope. Blog from 2007-2017
 Interview in Review 31. not dated.
 Guardian author page.
 Sukhdev Sandhu's interview-profile of Zero Books authors in The Guardian. February 17, 2012

1984 births
Living people
British male writers
Writers from Hexham